The Mermaid-class frigates were a group of six 28-gun sailing frigates of the sixth rate designed in 1760 by Sir Thomas Slade, based on the scaled-down lines of HMS Aurora (originally a French prize, L'Abénaquise, which had been captured in 1757). 

The contract for the prototype was agreed on 12 May 1760, for a ship to be launched within twelve months, and her name was assigned as Mermaid on 28 October 1760. The contract for the second ship was agreed on 10 March 1762, for a ship to be launched within thirteen months, and the contract for the third ship was agreed on 2 April 1762, for a ship to be launched within fourteen months; both names were assigned on 30 April 1763.

Some ten years after the design was first produced, it was re-used for a second batch of three ships which were ordered on Christmas Day, 1770. While the design differences from the first batch were minor (the keel was a few inches longer), the second batch were normally designated the Modified Mermaid class.

Ships in class 
First batch
 Mermaid
 Ordered: 24 April 1760
 Built by:  Hugh Blaydes, Hull.
 Keel laid:  27 May 1760
 Launched:  6 May 1761
 Completed:  September 1761 at the builder's yard.
 Fate:  Run ashore to avoid capture by the French 8 July 1778.
 Hussar
 Ordered: 30 January 1762
 Built by:  Thomas Inwood, Rotherhithe.
 Keel laid: 1 April 1762
 Launched:  26 August 1763
 Completed:  7 November 1763 at Deptford Dockyard.
 Fate:  Wrecked in Hell's Gate passage, New York, on 24 November 1779.
 Solebay
 Ordered 30 January 1762
 Built by:  Thomas Airey & Company, Newcastle.
 Keel laid:  10 May 1762
 Launched:  9 September 1763
 Completed:  December 1763 at the builder's yard, then 2 January to 15 March 1764 at Sheerness Dockyard.
 Fate:  Wrecked off Nevis Island and burnt to avoid capture 25 January 1782.
Second batch
 Greyhound
 Ordered: 25 December 1770
 Built by:  Henry Adams, Bucklers Hard.
 Keel laid:  February 1771
 Launched:  20 July 1773
 Completed:  October 1775 to 9 January 1776 at Portsmouth Dockyard.
 Fate:  Wrecked off Deal 16 August 1781.
 Triton
 Ordered: 25 December 1770
 Built by:  Henry Adams, Bucklers Hard.
 Keel laid: February 1771
 Launched:  1 October 1773
 Completed:  15 October 1773 to 4 November 1775 at Portsmouth Dockyard.
 Fate:  Taken to pieces at Deptford Dockyard in January 1796.
 Boreas
 Ordered: 25 December 1770
 Built by:  Hugh Blaydes & Hodgson, Hull.
 Keel laid:  May 1771
 Launched:  23 August 1774
 Completed:  13 September 1774 to 23 October 1775 at Chatham Dockyard.
 Fate:  Sold at Sheerness Dockyard May 1802.

References 

 David Lyon, The Sailing Navy List, Brasseys Publications, London 1993.
 Rif Winfield, British Warships in the Age of Sail, 1714 to 1792: Design, Construction, Careers and Fates, Seaforth Publishing, Barnsley 2007. .

Frigate classes